Leandro Nicolás Teijo (born 27 July 1991) is an Argentine footballer playing as a midfielder for Italian club Martina.

Club career
Teijo signed for Slovenian side FC Koper in the summer of 2016.

On 23 April 2021, Teijo joined Italian Eccellenza club Martina.

Career statistics

Club

Notes

References

External links
 Leandro Teijo at PrvaLiga 

1991 births
Living people
Argentine footballers
Argentine expatriate footballers
Association football midfielders
Club Atlético Vélez Sarsfield footballers
All Boys footballers
Racing de Olavarría footballers
Nueva Chicago footballers
FC Koper players
Club Atlético Alvarado players
FK Liepāja players
A.S.D. Martina Calcio 1947 players
Slovenian PrvaLiga players
Torneo Federal A players
Primera Nacional players
Latvian Higher League players
Expatriate footballers in Slovenia
Expatriate footballers in Latvia
Expatriate footballers in Italy
Argentine expatriate sportspeople in Slovenia
Argentine expatriate sportspeople in Latvia
Argentine expatriate sportspeople in Italy
Footballers from Buenos Aires